Vordingborg is an old ferry town in Vordingborg Municipality in Denmark with around 12.000 (2022) inhabitants. Because of three large estates surrounding the town, a coherent urban development has not been possible, which is the reason why three satellite towns (former villages) have emerged around the town. Within the ring of estates, the town has 12,000 inhabitants, and 17,868 inhabitants when including the three satellite towns of Ørslev, Nyråd, and Stensved, situated 1, 3 and 5 kilometres, respectively, from the town of Vordingborg.
Vordingborg Municipality (Kommune) has a population of 45,352.

Long term head coach of the Danish national football team, Morten Olsen, was born in Vordingborg.

History
On 1 January 2007 the old Vordingborg municipality was, as the result of Kommunalreformen ("The Municipal Reform" of 2007), merged with Langebæk, Møn,  and Præstø municipalities to form an enlarged Vordingborg municipality.

Geography
Vordingborg is situated 37 km from Nykøbing Falster, roughly 50 km from Gedser, and roughly 100 km from Copenhagen and Odense. The town is situated on the island of Zealand and is linked to the island of Falster with Farø Bridges and Storstrøm Bridge.

Economy
Vordingborg Municipality is home to 9,500 jobs. Companies headquartered in Vordingborg include Vordingborg Køkkener, a kitchen manufacturer. Udbetaling Danmark, a public institution under ARP, has one of its five regional centres in the town.

Attractions
The ruins of Vordingborg Castle, the old royal castle which was built around 1364, is the town's most famous attraction.  The only fully remaining part of the castle, the 26 meter tall Goose Tower (Gåsetårnet), is the symbol of the city.  It is the largest of King Valdemar Atterdag's nine main castle towers.  The name comes from the golden goose perched on top of the tower's spire.  Legend has it that Valdemar Atterdag used the symbol to taunt the Hanseatic League. The current goose was put there in 1871. It is not certain what was on top of the tower before 1871 and maybe it was just a weather vane made of gold.  The tower was transferred into the national trust on 24 December 1808 and is thus the first protected historic monument in Denmark.

A historic garden is also located on the site of the ruin.

Vordingborg is the home of the South Zealand Museum (Sydsjællands Museum).

The city holds an annual festival, Vordingborg Fest Week (Vordingborg Festuge) in July.

The Vordingborg Transmitter is one of the tallest towers in Denmark.

The Danish Army operates a barracks facility on the edge of town, known as Vordingborg Kaserne.

Notable people

 Anne Lykke (1595 in Vordingborg Castle – 1641) a Danish noblewoman and royal mistress of Christian, Prince Elect of Denmark
 Jacob Baden (1735 in Vordingborg – 1804) a philologist, pedagogue, critic and academic
 Peter Andreas Heiberg (1758 in Vordingborg - 1841) a Danish author and philologist
 Frederik Christian Kielsen (1774-1850) a Danish schoolmaster, published copiously illustrated books on natural history;  he lectured at the Latin School in Vordingborg from 1819 to 1833
 N. F. S. Grundtvig (1783 in Udby near Vordingborg – 1872) a Danish pastor, author, poet, philosopher, historian and politician
 Martin Hammerich (1811 - 1881 in Iselingen) an art historian, educator, author and translator.
 Meïr Aron Goldschmidt (1819 in Vordingborg – 1887) a publisher, journalist and novelist 
 Carl Lange (1834 in Vordingborg – 1900) a physician, worked on neurology, psychiatry and psychology
 Julius Lange (1838 in Vordingborg – 1896) a Danish art historian and critic
 Astrid Stampe Feddersen (1852 in Christinelund – 1930) a Danish women's rights activist
 Jacob Ellehammer (1871 in Bakkebølle – 1946) a Danish watchmaker, inventor and contributor to powered flight
 Johannes Friis-Skotte (1874 in Vordingborg – 1946) a Danish politician and minister
 Jesper Ewald (1893 in Vordingborg – 1969 in Copenhagen) an author, journalist and translator
 Jesper Juul (born 1948 in Vordingborg) a family therapist and author on parenting 
 Yenz Leonhardt (born 1961 in Vordingborg) a heavy metal musician
 Anders Trentemøller (born 1974 in Vordingborg) an electronic music producer and multi-instrumentalist

Sport 
 Vagn Ingerslev (1885 in Vordingborg – 1952) a tennis player, competed at the 1912 Summer Olympics
 Morten Olsen (born 1949) former footballer with 531 club caps and 102 for Denmark with whom he was head coach from 2000 until 2015
 Birger Pedersen (born 1950 in Vordingborg) a Danish former footballer, 14 caps for Denmark
 Steven Lustü (born 1971 in Vordingborg) a Danish former footballer with 9 caps for Denmark

Twin towns
Vordingborg is twinned with:
 Słupsk, Poland - since 1994.

See also

Vordingborg Castle
Farø Bridges
Masnedsund Bridge
Storstrøm Bridge

References

External links

Official site of Vordingborg

Municipal seats of Region Zealand
Municipal seats of Denmark
Cities and towns in Region Zealand
Vordingborg Municipality